Rezg (also Romanized as Razq, Razg, and Rezq) is a village in Meyghan Rural District, in the Central District of Nehbandan County, South Khorasan Province, Iran. At the 2006 census, its population was 35, in 6 families.

References 

Populated places in Nehbandan County